Oxypoda is a genus of beetles belonging to the family Staphylinidae.

The genus has almost cosmopolitan distribution.

Species:
 Oxypoda abdominalis (Mannerheim, 1830) 
 Oxypoda acuminata (Stephens, 1832)

References

Staphylinidae
Staphylinidae genera